Brian Alberto García Carpizo (born 31 October 1997) is a Mexican professional footballer who plays as a defender for Liga MX club Toluca.

Personal life
Brian's older brother, Alberto, is also a professional footballer who plays as a forward.

Career statistics

Club

References

External links
 
 
 

Living people
1997 births
Mexican footballers
Association football midfielders
Cimarrones de Sonora players
Club Necaxa footballers
Liga de Expansión MX players
Liga MX players
Liga Premier de México players
Tercera División de México players
Footballers from Guanajuato
Sportspeople from León, Guanajuato